Professor Alanna Nobbs is the President of the Society for the Study of Early Christianity.

She earned a BA Hons1 and PhD in Latin at the University of Sydney.  She taught at Macquarie University and was Head of School. Her specialization being in Greek Early Christian and Byzantine documents.

She was recognised in the Queen’s Birthday 2012 list with the award of Member of the Order of Australia for her service to ancient history and the classics.
Her husband is former fellow professor at Macquarie University, Ray Nobbs, who was also Dean of the Australian College of Theology.

About the society
The society  was established by the Vice-Chancellor on 8 May 1987, and a Constitution for the Society was approved by the Council of Macquarie University in December 1987. The society has no ecclesiastical ties, however it collaborates on academic occasions with Christian and Jewish theology colleges and communities. Its president is Professor Alanna Nobbs.

The society circulates three newsletters a year outlining its activities.

 May SSEC Conference - an annual conference hosting international speakers on issues of the New Testament and early Christianity.

Publications
 Into all the world : emergent Christianity in its Jewish and Greco-Roman context, 2017
 All things to all cultures : Paul among Jews, Greeks, and Romans, 2013
 Jerusalem and Athens : cultural transformation in late antiquity, 2010
 The content and setting of the Gospel tradition, 2010
 Ungodly women in Revelation, 1990
 Kambala : the first hundred years, 1887-1987, 1987

References

External links
 Society for the Study of Early Christianity Homepage
 Society for the Study of Early Christianity Conference Page
 Staff profile page of Prof Alanna Nobbs at Macquarie Uni

Academic staff of Macquarie University
Living people
University of Sydney alumni
Members of the Order of Australia
Year of birth missing (living people)
Australian religious writers
20th-century Australian non-fiction writers
21st-century Australian non-fiction writers
20th-century Australian women writers
21st-century Australian women writers